Volkan Oezdemir (born 19 September 1989) is a Swiss professional mixed martial artist and former kickboxing practitioner. He currently competes in the Light heavyweight division in the Ultimate Fighting Championship (UFC). A professional competitor since 2010, Oezdemir formerly competed for Bellator. As a kickboxing practitioner, he competed for Superkombat Fighting Championship in their heavyweight division. As of March 13, 2023, he is #8 in the UFC light heavyweight rankings.

Background
Oezdemir was born in the French-speaking part of Switzerland. His father from Turkey is ethnically Kurdish and his mother is Swiss. He befriended Alistair Overeem on a visit to the Netherlands while training at the Golden Glory gym. Oezdemir later competed in amateur and professional kickboxing, as well as Brazilian Jiu-Jitsu, before transitioning to mixed martial arts.

Mixed martial arts career

Early career
Oezdemir made his professional MMA debut in 2010, and compiled a record of 9–0 before being signed by Bellator.

Bellator MMA
Oezdemir made his promotional debut at Bellator 105 on October 25, 2013, against Josh Lanier. He won the fight via first-round TKO.

Oezdemir then dropped down to the Light Heavyweight division to face Kelly Anundson at Bellator 115 on April 4, 2014. He lost the fight via a neck crank submission in the second round.

Ultimate Fighting Championship
Oezdemir was signed by the UFC in 2017, and made his promotional debut as a short notice injury replacement against Ovince St. Preux on February 4, 2017, at UFC Fight Night 104. Oezdemir defeated St. Preux by split decision in the third fight of the main card.

In his second fight for the promotion, Oezdemir faced Misha Cirkunov on May 28, 2017, at UFC Fight Night 109. He won the fight via knockout just 28 seconds into the first round.

Oezdemir next faced third ranked Jimi Manuwa on July 29, 2017, at UFC 214. He won the fight via knockout in the fight's opening minute and subsequently won a Performance of the Night bonus.

Oezdemir faced Daniel Cormier on January 20, 2018, at UFC 220 for the UFC Light Heavyweight Championship. He lost the fight via TKO in the second round.

Oezdemir was expected to face Maurício Rua on May 12, 2018, at UFC Fight Night 129. However it was reported on April 13, 2018, that Oezdemir was pulled from the event due to alleged visa issues restricting his travel to Chile. The pairing was left intact and rescheduled for July 22, 2018, at UFC Fight Night 134. On July 2, 2018, it was reported that the Oezdemir  would face Alexander Gustafsson instead on August 4, 2018, at UFC 227. However, on July 19, 2018, it was reported that Oezdemir was removed from the bout due to a broken nose.

Oezdemir faced Anthony Smith on October 27, 2018, at UFC Fight Night 138. He lost the fight via a rear-naked choke submission in the third round.

Oezdemir faced Dominick Reyes on March 16, 2019, at UFC Fight Night 147. He lost the fight via controversial split decision.

Oezdemir was expected to face Ilir Latifi on June 1, 2019, at UFC Fight Night 153. On May 30, 2019, it was reported that Latifi was forced to pull out of the event due to back injury and the bout was cancelled.  The pair was rebooked at UFC on ESPN 5 on August 3, 2019. In turn, due to Oezdemir's visa issues entering the United States, the bout was moved to UFC Fight Night 156. He won the fight via knockout in the second round. This win earned him the Performance of the Night award.

Oezdemir faced Aleksandar Rakić on December 21, 2019, at UFC Fight Night 165. He won the fight via split decision.

In April 2020, Oezdemir revealed that he had renewed his contract with the UFC.

Oezdemir faced promotional newcomer Jiří Procházka on July 12, 2020, at UFC 251. He lost the fight via knockout in the second round.

Oezdemir was expected to face Nikita Krylov on October 18, 2020, at UFC Fight Night 180. However, Oezdemir pulled out of the fight in early October citing a knee injury.

Oezdemir was scheduled to face Magomed Ankalaev on September 4, 2021, at UFC Fight Night 191. However, the fight was rescheduled for UFC 267 in Abu Dhabi on October 30. He lost the bout via unanimous decision.

Oezdemir faced Paul Craig on July 23, 2022, at UFC Fight Night 208. He won the bout by unanimous decision.

Oezdemir faced Nikita Krylov on October 22, 2022, at UFC 280. He lost the bout via unanimous decision.

Kickboxing career
Oezdemir also holds a record of 5–0 in professional kickboxing. He made his debut in Romania-based SUPERKOMBAT, the largest kickboxing promotion in Europe, in 2014.

Personal life

Aggravated battery case 
On 19 November 2017, Oezdemir was arrested for aggravated battery. His bail was reportedly set at $10,000. On 9 July 2018, he informed that the charges pressed against him were dropped.

Championships and accomplishments

Mixed martial arts
Ultimate Fighting Championship
Performance of the Night (Two times) 
MMA Mania.com
UFC/MMA 'Fighter of the Year' 2017 – Top 5 List #5
World Kickboxing Network
Valhalla: Battle of the Vikings Tournament Winner
Sherdog
2017 Breakthrough Fighter of the Year
MMAjunkie.com
2017 Breakout of the Year
Bloody Elbow
2017 Newcomer of the Year

Mixed martial arts record

|-
|Loss
|align=center|18–7
|Nikita Krylov
|Decision (unanimous)
|UFC 280
|
|align=center|3
|align=center|5:00
|Abu Dhabi, United Arab Emirates
|
|-
|Win
|align=center|18–6
|Paul Craig
|Decision (unanimous)
|UFC Fight Night: Blaydes vs. Aspinall 
|
|align=center|3
|align=center|5:00
|London, England
|
|-
|Loss
|align=center|17–6
|Magomed Ankalaev 
|Decision (unanimous)
|UFC 267 
|
|align=center|3
|align=center|5:00
|Abu Dhabi, United Arab Emirates
|  
|-
|Loss
|align=center|17–5
|Jiří Procházka
|KO (punch)
|UFC 251 
|
|align=center|2
|align=center|0:49
|Abu Dhabi, United Arab Emirates
|
|-
|Win
|align=center|17–4
|Aleksandar Rakić
|Decision (split)
|UFC Fight Night: Edgar vs. The Korean Zombie 
|
|align=center|3
|align=center|5:00
|Busan, South Korea
|
|-
|Win
|align=center|16–4
|Ilir Latifi
|KO (punches) 
|UFC Fight Night: Shevchenko vs. Carmouche 2 
|
|align=center|2
|align=center|4:31
|Montevideo, Uruguay
|
|-
|Loss
|align=center|15–4
|Dominick Reyes
|Decision (split)
|UFC Fight Night: Till vs. Masvidal 
|
|align=center|3
|align=center|5:00
|London, England
|
|-
|Loss
|align=center|15–3
|Anthony Smith
|Submission (rear-naked choke)
|UFC Fight Night: Volkan vs. Smith 
|
|align=center|3
|align=center|4:26
|Moncton, New Brunswick, Canada
|
|-
|Loss
|align=center|15–2
|Daniel Cormier
|TKO (punches)
|UFC 220 
|
|align=center|2
|align=center|2:00
|Boston, Massachusetts, United States
|
|-
|Win
|align=center|15–1
|Jimi Manuwa
|KO (punches)
|UFC 214
|
|align=center|1
|align=center|0:42
|Anaheim, California, United States
|
|-
|Win
|align=center|14–1
|Misha Cirkunov
|KO (punch)
|UFC Fight Night: Gustafsson vs. Teixeira
|
|align=center|1
|align=center|0:28
|Stockholm, Sweden
|
|-
|Win
|align=center|13–1
|Ovince Saint Preux
|Decision (split)
|UFC Fight Night: Bermudez vs. The Korean Zombie
|
|align=center|3
|align=center|5:00
|Houston, Texas, United States
|
|-
|Win
|align=center|12–1
|Alihan Vahaev
|Decision (unanimous)
|WFCA 17: Grand Prix Akhmat 
|
|align=center|3
|align=center|5:00
|Grozny, Russia
|
|-
|Win
|align=center|11–1
|Paco Estevez
|TKO (punches)
|SHC 10: Carvalho vs. Belo
|
|align=center|1
|align=center|N/A
|Geneva, Switzerland
|
|-
|Loss
|align=center|10–1
|Kelly Anundson
|Submission (neck crank)
|Bellator 115
|
|align=center|2
|align=center|3:19
|Reno, Nevada, United States
|
|-
|Win
|align=center|10–0
|Josh Lanier
|TKO (punches and elbows)
|Bellator 105
|
|align=center|1
|align=center|3:13
|Rio Rancho, New Mexico, United States
|
|-
|Win
|align=center|9–0
|David Round
|TKO (punches)
|WKN Valhalla: Battle of the Vikings
|
|align=center|1
|align=center|N/A
|Aarhus, Denmark
|
|-
|Win
|align=center|8–0
|Angelier Benjamin
|KO (punches)
|WKN Valhalla: Battle of the Vikings
|
|align=center|1
|align=center|0:45
|Aarhus, Denmark
|
|-
|Win
|align=center|7–0
|Benyaich Mohamed
|TKO (punches)
|WKN Valhalla: Battle of the Vikings
|
|align=center|1
|align=center|0:15
|Aarhus, Denmark
|
|-
|Win
|align=center|6–0
|Mohamed Amidi
|TKO (punches)
|SHC 6:  Belo vs. Rodriguez
|
|align=center|1
|align=center|1:59
|Geneva, Switzerland
|
|-
|Win
|align=center|5–0
|Bruno Farias Grancheux
|TKO (punches)
|Lions Fighting Championship 4
|
|align=center|1
|align=center|1:54
|Itabuna, Brazil
|
|-
|Win
|align=center|4–0
|Ronilson Santos
|TKO (retirement)
|Lions Fighting Championship 3
|
|align=center|1
|align=center|2:12
|Itabuna, Brazil
|
|-
|Win
|align=center|3–0
|Mamadou Cisse
|Submission (kimura)
|100% Fight 10: Supreme League Block C
|
|align=center|1
|align=center|3:43
|Paris, France
|
|-
|Win
|align=center|2–0
|Boubacar Baldé
|Decision (unanimous)
|Lions Fighting Championship
|
|align=center|3
|align=center|5:00
|Neuchatel, Switzerland
|
|-
|Win
|align=center|1–0
|Martin Vath
|TKO (punches)
|Shooto: Switzerland 7
|
|align=center|1
|align=center|0:56
|Zurich, Switzerland
|
|-

Kickboxing record (incomplete)

|-  style="text-align:centr; background:#cfc;"
|2014-10-25 || Win  ||align=left| Nordine Mahieddine ||SUPERKOMBAT World Grand Prix 2014 Final Elimination, Super Fight ||Geneva, Switzerland ||Decision (Majority) || 3 || 3:00
|-  style="text-align:centr; background:#cfc;"
|2014-10-04 || Win  ||align=left| Patrick Schmid ||Champions Fight Night 2 ||Switzerland ||TKO (Doctor Stoppage) || 2 || N/A
|-  style="text-align:centr; background:#cfc;"
|2014-09-27 || Win  ||align=left| Kévin Bavelard ||Jura Fight Night ||Delémont, Switzerland || TKO || 2 || N/A
|-
|-
| colspan=9 | Legend:

References

External links

1989 births
Swiss male kickboxers
Heavyweight mixed martial artists
Swiss people of Turkish descent
Swiss people of Kurdish descent
People from Fribourg
Swiss male mixed martial artists
Living people
Light heavyweight mixed martial artists
Mixed martial artists utilizing kickboxing
Mixed martial artists utilizing Brazilian jiu-jitsu
Swiss practitioners of Brazilian jiu-jitsu
Heavyweight kickboxers
Ultimate Fighting Championship male fighters
SUPERKOMBAT kickboxers
Kurdish sportspeople
Sportspeople from the canton of Fribourg